The 2002 UCI Cyclo-cross World Championships were held in Zolder, Belgium on Saturday February 2 and Sunday February 3, 2002.

Medal summary

Medal table

Men's Elite
 Held on Sunday February 3, 2002

Women's Elite
 Held on Sunday February 3, 2002

External links
 UCI site
 Sports123
 CyclingNews

UCI Cyclo-cross World Championships
World Championships
C
International cycle races hosted by Belgium
Circuit Zolder
February 2002 sports events in Europe